Notonomus depressipennis is a species of ground beetle in the subfamily Pterostichinae. It was described by Maximilien Chaudoir in 1874.

References

Notonomus
Beetles described in 1874